Mariano Andújar (born 30 July 1983) is an Argentine professional footballer who plays as a goalkeeper for Argentine Primera División club Estudiantes.

Club career
In 2009, Andújar was the first team goalkeeper in Estudiantes' Copa Libertadores winning team. Andújar did not concede a single goal in any of the eight games in La Plata and he set a new tournament record of 800 minutes without conceding a goal, beating Hugo Gatti's 767 minutes.

On 24 June 2009, Italian club Catania officially announced that the club had signed the player to a four-year deal.

On 24 January 2014, Napoli's official website posted that Andújar was in Naples completing a medical in preparation for his move to the Italian club. Four days later, a co-ownership deal was reached, with Andújar being loaned back to Catania for the remainder of the season. He will join Napoli at the start of the 2014–15 campaign.
He made his debut in Naples on 11 December 2014, in a match against Slovan Bratislava (winning 3–0), in the 2014–15 UEFA Europa League, in the last match of the group stage.

During the midway point of the 2014–15 season, Andújar secured his place in Napoli's starting lineup, thanks to good performances and the decline of Napoli first-choice keeper Rafael. On 24 April 2015, Andújar led Napoli to the Europa League semi-finals with a solid performance against VfL Wolfsburg. Napoli advanced from the tie with a 6–3 aggregate.

On 9 March 2022, Estudiantes overcame Everton of Chile in the third round of the Copa Libertadores 2022, at the Sausalito Stadium, and reached 41 Copa Libertadores matches with Estudiantes' jersey. Thus, he reached the club's all-time podium in such competition, surpassing Juan Sebastián Verón's record. 

On Sunday, 20 March 2022, after Estudiantes' draw against Gimnasia at the Juan Carmelo Zerillo Stadium, for the Professional League Cup, Mariano Andújar became the fifth player with the highest number of appearances in the club's history, with 363 official matches played, and the first in the goalkeeper position.

International career
Andújar made his debut for the Argentina national team in a 2010 FIFA World Cup qualifier against Colombia on 6 June 2009.

During the 2010 FIFA World Cup and 2011 Copa América, Andújar served as understudy to Sergio Romero, the first choice goalkeeper for the Albiceleste.

In June 2014, Andújar was named in Argentina's squad for the 2014 FIFA World Cup.

Personal life
Facundo Andújar is Mariano's brother, he is also a professional footballer.

Honours
Estudiantes
Argentine Primera División: 2006 Apertura
Copa Libertadores: 2009

Napoli
Supercoppa Italiana: 2014

Argentina
FIFA World Cup runner-up: 2014
Copa América runner-up: 2016

References

External links

 Argentine Primera statistics  
 
 Football-Lineups
 
 
 

1983 births
Argentine people of Spanish descent
Argentine footballers
Argentina international footballers
Argentine expatriate footballers
Association football goalkeepers
Club Atlético Huracán footballers
Palermo F.C. players
Estudiantes de La Plata footballers
Catania S.S.D. players
S.S.C. Napoli players
Argentine Primera División players
Primera Nacional players
Serie A players
Expatriate footballers in Italy
Footballers from Buenos Aires
Living people
2010 FIFA World Cup players
2011 Copa América players
2014 FIFA World Cup players
2015 Copa América players
Copa América Centenario players
Argentine expatriate sportspeople in Italy